KKFT (99.1 MHz, "99.1 FM Talk") is a commercial FM radio station licensed to Gardnerville–Minden, Nevada, and broadcasting to the Reno–Carson City radio market. KKFT airs a talk radio format and is owned and operated by the Evans Broadcast Group.

Studios and offices are on Idaho Street in Carson City. The main transmitter is off Goni Road, also in Carson City. KKFT can also be heard on a 3,250-watt booster station, KKFT-FM1 in Stateline, Nevada.

Programming
KKFT mostly carries nationally syndicated conservative talk shows: Armstrong & Getty, Tom Sullivan, Lars Larson, Jimmy Failla, John B. Wells, Markley, Van Camp & Robbins and Coast to Coast AM with George Noory. Weekends feature shows on health, money, home repair, technology and guns. Weekend hosts include Hugh Hewitt, Our American Stories with Lee Habeeb, The Ramsey Show with Dave Ramsey, At Home with Gary Sullivan, Gun Talk with Tom Gresham and Leo Laporte, The Tech Guy. Most hours begin with world and national news from Fox News Radio.

KKFT once aired the only Carson-Reno-Tahoe local weekday morning talk show hosted by conservative Monica Jaye. She was formerly at rival talk station 780 KKOH.

History
On September 1, 1985, the station first signed on as KGVM. The station had an effective radiated power (ERP) 3,000 watts from a tower that was minus 815 feet in height above average terrain (HAAT), so its coverage area was limited. The station was owned by Lloyd W. Higuera using the corporate name Carson Valley Radio and it had a soft adult contemporary format.

In 2003, the station was bought by Jerry Evans for $850,000. Evans increased the tower height to its current , giving the station good coverage in the cities of Reno, Sparks and Carson City. The station switched to its current talk format, to compete with the Reno radio market's 50,000-watt talk leader, KKOH, 780 AM, owned and operated by Cumulus Media.

References

External links
 

1985 establishments in Nevada
News and talk radio stations in the United States
KFT
Radio stations established in 1985